Goochland is a census-designated place (CDP) in and the county seat of Goochland County, Virginia, United States. The population as of the 2010 census was 861. The community is also known as Goochland Courthouse or by an alternative spelling, Goochland Court House. It derives its name from the fact that the community is the location of the county's court house, while the county in turn is named for Sir William Gooch, 1st Baronet, the royal lieutenant governor of Virginia from 1727 to 1749.

Geography
Goochland is located just south of the center of Goochland County and just north of the James River. U.S. Route 522 passes through the center of the community, leading north  to Mineral and south  to its southern terminus at U.S. Route 60 near Powhatan. Virginia Route 6 follows US 522 through the center of Goochland, but leads east  to Richmond and west  to Columbia. Interstate 64 passes  to the northeast of Goochland, with access from Exit 159 at Gum Spring (US 522) and from Exit 167 at Oilville.

Notable people
 Carl Gordon (1932–2010), actor best known for appearing on the Fox TV series Roc.
 John Hicks, catcher for MLB's Texas Rangers.
 Justin Verlander, Cy Young winning pitcher for MLB's Detroit Tigers and MLB's Houston Astros.

In popular culture
A fictionalized, larger version of Goochland is depicted in the "Escape from Goochland" episode of The Cleveland Show, as the home of Stoolbend's arch-rival high school.

Goochland is featured in Season 7 Episode 15 of the X-Files, in which the child of a local Christian family is miraculously cured of cancer.

See also

 List of census-designated places in Virginia

References

External links

Census-designated places in Goochland County, Virginia
County seats in Virginia
Census-designated places in Virginia
Populated places on the James River (Virginia)